James Arnold Murray (born November 25, 1943 in Virden, Manitoba) is a former professional ice hockey defenceman, who played 30 games in the National Hockey League with the Los Angeles Kings.  In those 30 games, he made two assists and collected 14 penalty minutes.

Awards and achievements
MJHL First All-Star Team (1964)
Turnbull Cup (MJHL) Championship (1962, 1963, & 1964)

External links

1943 births
Brandon Wheat Kings players
Canadian ice hockey defencemen
Ice hockey people from Manitoba
Johnstown Jets players
Living people
Los Angeles Kings players
New York Rovers players
People from Virden, Manitoba
Winston-Salem Polar Twins (SHL) players
Canadian expatriate ice hockey players in the United States